Abusina or Abusena was a Roman castra (military outpost), and later of town, of the Roman Province of Raetia.

It was at Eining near Abensberg, on the Upper German- Raetian Limes , which at this point was the Danube River. Abusina stood near to the eastern termination of the high road which ran from the Roman military station Vindonissa on the Aar to the Danube.

In the 2nd century the fort was occupied by the Cohors IV Tungrorum with about 1,000 men.
By the later Roman Empire, archaeology and  the Notitia Dignitatum suggest the site was occupied by Cohors III Brittonum with only 50 men.

References

Roman fortifications in Germania Inferior
Roman waystations